The Spontis or Sponti movement was left-wing movement in West Germany in 1970s-1980s. the name is an abbreviation for the word "spontaneous", in reference to their preference of "revolutionary spontaneity of the masses" over theoretically- and party-based movements. A significant force of this movement were university students.

Sponti-Sprüche 
A notable feature of the Spontis was their  ("Sponti-Sprüche") - slogans and adages, often humorous and sarcastic, parodying various political slogans and mottos or twisting the well-known proverbs and sayings. For example: "Yesterday we were on the edge of the abyss. Today we are stepping forward," or "Liberté, Égalité, Pfefferminztee".

Some of Sponti sayings, such as "Wissen ist Macht, nichts wissen, macht auch nichts" ("Knowledge is Power, (but) knowing nothing does not matter anyway") survived for many years after Sponti times, sometimes acquiring different meanings. Ulrike Rechel says that it "probably belongs to the top 5 of all slogans on toilet walls in universities or schools". She further comments that not knowing something seems to be not critical today, in the time of Google and Wikipedia, and smartphones, when any piece of knowledge is a couple of keyboard clicks away, in contrast to the times of Francis Bacon, when gaining knowledge was associated with much effort. But this attitude eventually leads to various social problems.  (See also Wissen ist Macht in Germany.)

Notable members
Joschka Fischer
Daniel Cohn-Bendit

References

Further reading
Elim Papadakis, The Green Movement in West Germany, Routledge, 2016 
 Contains a larger piece about Spontis
 Geronimo: Feuer und Flamme. ID Verlag, Berlin 1995, ISBN 3-89408-004-3

Politics of West Germany
Left-wing politics in Germany